Gawaher  is a Sudanese singer and songwriter, who has been based in Cairo since 1995. She is also recognized for mixing Nubian and Shaabi music with sub-Saharan tunes. She has dual Sudanese-Egyptian nationality.

Biography

Youth and first recordings 
Gawaher was born in Port Sudan, where she lived during the most of her childhood and teenage years with her family. During those early years, she started developing a deep interest in music. However, due to the music industry not being very good in Sudan, she realized that she couldn't start a music career in her home country, so she moved to Egypt, where the local music scene was booming with many popular singers and important music labels.

During her first years in Egypt, she performed in a hotel called Aswan as a singer and belly dancer for tourists. Then, her music taste started changing when she discovered Shaabi music.

Gawaher released her first studio album entitled "Ḥikāyah Gharībah" (Strange story) in 1995 with the label Ibn Al Khatib. This first album was completely recorded in Sudanese Arabic dialect and was characterised by a strong traditional Nubian flavour with an evident Sub-Saharan production and instrumentation. Although it was not very successful, thanks to this release, the young performed started catching the attention of some poets, producers and publishers who were surprised by her strong voice. A year later, this album was released in Saudi Arabia by a local record label.

In 1996, the singer released "Marat al-'ayām" her second studio album in which she collaborated with many Sudanese composers and poets and wrote some of the songs.

Transition to Shaabi 
One year later, in 1997, the singer left Ibn Al Khatib, her former record label, and in 1998, signed a contract with a much bigger label that had important singers of the Egyptian music scene such as Hamada Helal and Esam Karika, who signed with the company. In that new phase of her career she released "Telefonak", her third album, which is notable for a radical change of style from typical Sudanese melodies to Shaabi music. This album gave the singer her first hit songs such as "Hamada", that were very successful and enabled the singer to record music videos and to perform in TV shows.

In 1999, Gawaher released "A Alkornĕyş", her fourth album, a release known for its titular track and most popular song that was played in many events and parties even today. The song was accompanied with a colorful music video that was broadcast on Arabic music TV channels. Since then, her performances on TV shows started becoming even more frequent. She counted, in this release, with the collaboration of Ashraf Abdou, habitual producer of singers such as Mohammed Mounir, Latifa and Hakim. Thanks to the production and increased media attention, the success of this album was so huge, that Rotana, the pan Arabic music giant, released the album in the Levant region and the Gulf states.

Two years later, for her new album "Samara", the Gawaher collaborated, amongst others, with new producers such as Saleh Abu al-Dahab, who produced in the past songs for artists such as Mohammed fouad and Amr Diab. The most important song of this release is Haylo, which also turned into a great hit.

In 2003, the singer released her sixth album, Ana Laka, which was popular for its titular song and first single, which was also accompanied with a Promotional Video. This time, apart from her habitually cheerful and typically Shaabi songs, she started including deeper and more melancholic songs such as "Dawetek yama", dedicated to her mother.

Hiatus and comeback 
From 2004, to 2008, the Gawaher took four years of absence from the stages due to personal reasons. After that, she returned to the music scene with new collaborators such as Tarek Abdel Gaber, who composed songs for artists such as Sherine, Tamer Hosny, Samira Said and Asala Nasri amongst others. "Enday", which was the title of the release is notable for its nostalgic sound and for its return to African sounds and to the Sudanese dialect. Since then, the singer diminished her musical activity until 2015, when she started releasing new sons such as "Gany alasmarany", a version of a famous hit originally sung by the Saudi singing legend Etab which also makes it her first song in the Khaleeji Arabic dialect.

Discography

Studio albums 

 Ħekaya Ğarib (1995)
 Maret Aleyam (1996)
 Telefonak (1998)
 A Alkornĕyş (1999)
 Samara (2001)
 Ana Laka (2003)
 Enday (2008)

Singles 

 Ħekaya Ğarib (1995)
 Maret Aleyam (1996)
 Hamada (1998)
 Telefnak(1998)
 A Alkornĕyş (1999)
 Heylo (2001)
 Gawzahlo (2001)
 Al Korneish (2001)
 Samara (2001)
 Ana Laka (2003)
 Dawetek Yama (2003)
 Enday (2008)
 Gany el Asmarany (2015)
 Yadania w Hadany (2016)

References

External links 

 Gawaher's Profile in Discogs

20th-century Egyptian women singers
20th-century Sudanese women singers
21st-century Egyptian women singers